Kargilik County (transliterated from); from Mandarin Chinese Yecheng County, is a county in southwest of the Xinjiang Uyghur Autonomous Region and is under the administration of the Kashgar Prefecture. It contains an area of 28,600 km². To the north, the county borders Makit County. To the east, the county borders Guma County (Pishan) in Hotan Prefecture. To the west, the county borders Yarkant County, Poskam County and  Taxkorgan Tajik Autonomous County.

History
In 1975, future Communist Party of China Deputy Party Secretary of the Xinjiang Uyghur Autonomous Region Zhu Hailun was sent to Kargilik County in the Down to the Countryside Movement.

Geography
The northern part of the county is in the Taklamakan Desert and the southern part of the county is in the Kunlun Mountains. Mazar Pass is located in the southern part of the county.

Climate

Administrative divisions
Town (بازىرى / 镇)

Kargilik Town (Kageleke, Qaghiliq; قاغىلىق بازىرى / 喀格勒克镇), Charbagh Town (Qia'erbage; چارباغ بازىرى / 恰尔巴格镇), Ushsharbash Town (Wuxiabashi; ئۇششارباش بازىرى / ; also Wuxiakebashi 乌夏克巴什镇)
Township (يېزىسى / 乡) 	
Loq Township (Luoke; لوق يېزىسى / 洛克乡), Besheriq Township (Baxireke; بەشئېرىق يېزىسى / 伯西热克乡), Tetir Township (Tieti; تېتىر يېزىسى / 铁提乡), Chasa Meschit Township (Qiasameiqite, Qiasimiqiti; چاسا مەسچىت يېزىسى / 恰萨美其特乡 / 恰斯米其提乡 ), Tögichi Township (Tuguqi; تۆگىچى يېزىسى / 吐古其乡), Janggilieski Township (Jianggelesi; جاڭگىلىئەسكى يېزىسى / 江格勒斯乡), Jayterak Township (Jiayitileke, Janyterek;  / ), Barin Township (Baren; بارىن يېزىسى / 巴仁乡), Ghojaeriq Township (Wujireke; غوجائېرىق يېزىسى / 乌吉热克乡), Shaxap Township (Xiahefu; شاخاپ يېزىسى / 夏合甫乡), Yilkiqi Township (Yilikeqi, Yilqichi; يىلقىچى يېزىسى / ), Yitimliqum Township (Yitimukong; يىتىملىقۇم يېزىسى / 依提木孔乡), Zunglang Township (Zonglang; زۇڭلاڭ يېزىسى / 宗朗乡), Kokyar Township (Kekeya;  / ), Shixshu Township (Xihexiu;  / ), Chipan Township (Qipan; چىپان يېزىسى / 棋盘乡), Saybagh Township (Sayibage; سايباغ يېزىسى / 萨依巴格乡)
Others (其他)
兵团叶城牧场 | 阿克塔什农场 | 普萨牧场 | 叶城县公安农场 | 叶城县良种场 | 叶城县园艺场 | 叶城县林场 | 叶城县种畜场

Economy
Kargilik County's economy is based on agriculture and animal husbandry. Agricultural products include wheat, corn and cotton, as well as pomegranates, yellow pears, walnuts, and dried apricots. Industries include construction, machinery, electronics, and food processing. The county is known for the 'Kargilik Banximao Sheep'.

Demographics

In 1997, Uyghurs made up 93% of the population of the county and Han Chinese made up 6% of the population.

As of 2015, 490,417 of the 519,962 residents of the county were Uyghur, 23,408 were Han Chinese and 6,137 were from other ethnic groups.

, Uyghurs made up 91% of the population of the county.

As of 1999, 90.78% of the population of Kargilik (Yecheng) County was Uyghur and 8.18% of the population was Han Chinese.

Transportation
China National Highway 219
China National Highway 315
Kashgar–Hotan railway

Historical maps
Historical English-language maps including Kargilik:

See also
Trans-Karakoram Tract
Yarkand River
Bazar Dara

Notelist

References

County-level divisions of Xinjiang
Kashgar Prefecture